Douglas Paul Moreau (born February 15, 1945) is a former American football tight end in the American Football League (AFL) and current broadcaster along with being a literature teacher. He was drafted by the Miami Dolphins in the sixth round of the 1966 AFL Draft. He played college football at LSU.

Broadcasting career
Doug Moreau worked as both an LSU football radio analyst and sideline reporter from 1972 to 1981. From 1982 through 1987, he was the color analyst for LSU football games on TigerVision. He returned to the radio booth as color analyst in 1988.

Professional career
Moreau has served as assistant district attorney, judge and district attorney in East Baton Rouge Parish, Louisiana. He was Assistant District Attorney for the 19th Judicial District from 1974 to 1978; Judge, Baton Rouge City Court, Division B from 1978 to 1979; Judge, 19th Judicial District Court, Division E from 1979 to 1990 and served as District Attorney, 19th Judicial District from 1991 to 2009.

References

1945 births
Living people
Sportspeople from Thibodaux, Louisiana
American football tight ends
American football placekickers
American football wide receivers
American radio sports announcers
American television sports announcers
LSU Tigers football players
LSU Tigers football announcers
Miami Dolphins players
American Football League players